Bromus pacificus, the Pacific brome, is a perennial grass native to the Pacific coast of North America. Bromus pacificus has a diploid number of 28.

Taxonomy

Bromus pacificus is often misidentified as various species of Bromus sect. Ceratochloa, including B. carinatus and B. sitchensis. B. pacificus resembles these species with its large and open panicles, but its lemmas are rounded or slightly keeled as compared to the flattened lemmas of B. sect. Ceratochloa. In addition, B. pacificus typically occurs only near the coast of British Columbia while species of B. sect. Ceratochloa are more widely distributed, including habitats in California where B. pacificus has been misidentified.

Description

The leaf sheaths remain closed for most of their length, being open for only . Margins are smooth or slightly serrated. The rachillas can sometimes be visible at maturity. Spikelets have six to eight florets.

Distribution and habitat

Bromus pacificus occurs along the Pacific coast as its specific epithet indicates. It occurs from southeastern Alaska down to central Oregon; most often it occurs in the coast of British Columbia.

References

pacificus
Plants described in 1900